This article contains contestant information and episode summaries from Season 3 of the American competitive reality television series Hell's Kitchen. Cast during February 2007, the third season started airing on the Fox television network on June 4, 2007, and concluded on August 13, 2007.

The Hell's Kitchen set moved from a building at La Brea Avenue and Willoughby, where it was located for seasons one and two, to a Century Studios building on La Cienega Place, off West Jefferson Blvd for season three. During Episode 9 (aired July 30, 2007), a casting call was announced for the fourth season of the show.

This was the first Hell's Kitchen season to be filmed in 16:9 standard definition.

The season finale was a record high for the show's ratings, drawing 9.8 million viewers. Executive Chef Rock Harper won the season and was awarded a US$250,000 per year head-chef position at a restaurant in the Green Valley Ranch Resort and Spa in Henderson, Nevada.

Sous chefs and Maître d'hôtel
 Sous chefs – Scott Leibfried and Mary-Ann Salcedo
 Maître d'hôtel – Jean-Philippe Susilovic

Contestants
The third season features the following 12 contestants, who were separated by gender into two teams:

Contestant progress
Each week, the best member (as determined by Ramsay) from the losing team during the latest service period is asked to nominate two of their teammates for elimination; one of these two is sent home by Ramsay.

Episodes

References

Hell's Kitchen (American TV series)
2007 American television seasons